José Borregales (born December 15, 1997) is a Venezuelan American football placekicker for the Orlando Guardians of the XFL. He played college football at Florida International and the University of Miami.

High school career
Borregales attended Booker T. Washington Senior High School and was named a Florida Class 4A first-team selection. He also was named a First-team All Dade selection and a 2015 Kohl's All-American honorable mention. During his high school career, Borregales converted 13 of 14 field goals and 48 of 51 extra points. He committed to Florida International University to play college football.

College career

2016–2019
Borregales redshirted his first year at Florida International University. In 2017, he served as the team's starting kicker. During the 2017 season he connected on 15 of 18 field goals and went 40 for 40 on extra points. In 2018, he finished the season making 14 of 18 field goals and 54 of 55 extra points. Also in 2018, he was finalist for the Lou Groza Award as the nation's best college kicker. However, he fell short to Andre Szmyt in voting. In his final season at FIU, he finished with 21 of 29 field goals and converted all 40 extra point attempts.

2020
After graduating from FIU with a bachelor's degree in 2020, Borregales continued his football kicking career at the University of Miami, as a graduate student. At Miami, he went for 18 of 20 on field goal attempts and went for a perfect 35–35 on extra points. During a game with UAB, he kicked a field goal from 25 yards out. He was named ACC Specialist of the week after he went for 4 of 4 on field goals after win against the top 20 ranked Louisville Cardinals. During games against Florida State and Clemson he hit field goals from 30 and 42 yards out. In a game against Pittsburgh, he made a field goal from 37 yards out. Next week against Virginia he made  both field goals from 32 and 20 yards. He drilled 3 field goals in a come from behind win against NC State and made 2 field goals which were from 40 and 42 yards in a win against Virginia. He hit field goals from 52 and 32 yards during a game against Duke. He also hit a 47-yard field goal in his lone attempt against North Carolina. He was named a finalist for the Lou Groza award on December 22, 2020. Borregales was also invited to the 2021 Senior Bowl. On December 23, 2020, Borregales announced he will declare for the 2021 NFL Draft and would still be able to play in his team's bowl game. On May 1, after going undrafted in the 2021 NFL Draft, Borregales signed as a free agent with the Tampa Bay Buccaneers.

Statistics

Professional career

Tampa Bay Buccaneers 
Borregales signed with the Tampa Bay Buccaneers as an undrafted free agent on May 13, 2021. He was waived on September 6, 2021, and re-signed to the practice squad.

After the Buccaneers were eliminated in the Divisional Round of the 2021 playoffs, Borregales signed a reserve/future contract on January 24, 2022. He was waived on August 30, 2022.

Orlando Guardians 
On November 18, 2022, Borregales was drafted by the Orlando Guardians of the XFL.

Personal life
Borregales was born in Caracas, Venezuela and immigrated to the United States with his family at the age of six. He is the third Venezuelan born player to make it to the NFL. His brother Andres “El Borrego 2.0”, succeeded him as Miami's kicker after his departure to the NFL.

References

External links
 FIU Panthers bio
 Miami Hurricanes bio

Living people
American football placekickers
FIU Panthers football players
Miami Hurricanes football players
Orlando Guardians players
Players of American football from Miami
Tampa Bay Buccaneers players
Venezuelan emigrants to the United States
Venezuelan players of American football
1997 births